Cornel Trăilescu (11 August 1926, Timișoara – 8 January 2019) was a Romanian opera composer and conductor.

Major works
 Puss in boots (Motanul Încălțat) (1961)
 Bălcescu (1974)
 Love and Sacrifice (Dragoste și jertfă) (1977)

Sources
 Institutul de Memorie Culturală (Institute for Cultural Memory). Cornel Trăilescu. Accessed 11 January 2010 (in Romanian)

1926 births
2019 deaths
20th-century classical composers
21st-century classical composers
Male classical composers
Male opera composers
Musicians from Timișoara
Romanian classical composers
Romanian opera composers
20th-century male musicians
21st-century male musicians